Bryan Smith may refer to:
Bryan Smith, driver of a van that hit author Stephen King in 1999
Bryan Smith, a character in Stephen King's The Dark Tower based on the driver of the van that hit him
Bryan Smith (American football) (born 1983), defensive end
Bryan Smith (footballer) (born 1970), Scottish footballer (soccer) with Clydebank and Clyde
Bryan Smith (motorcyclist), American motorcycle racer
Bryan Smith, Canadian politician, Green Party candidate in Ontario 2003 election 
Bryan Smith, former member of Deep Banana Blackout
Bryan Smith, presenter for the Australian television series Beyond Tomorrow
Bryan Smyth (rugby league), Irish rugby league player

See also
Brian Smith (disambiguation)
Brian Smyth (disambiguation)